The Charles Lenont House is a historic house in Virginia, Minnesota, United States.  It was built in 1900 for Virginia's first mayor, Marcus Fay, then sold to Dr. Charles Lenont, who resided there until 1979.  In 1980 the house was listed  on the National Register of Historic Places for its local significance in the themes of architecture and social history.  It was nominated for being the city's best-preserved example of Queen Anne architecture and a manifestation of the class distinctions telegraphed by housing type on the early Iron Range.

See also
 National Register of Historic Places listings in St. Louis County, Minnesota

References

1900 establishments in Minnesota
Buildings and structures in Virginia, Minnesota
Houses completed in 1900
Houses in St. Louis County, Minnesota
Houses on the National Register of Historic Places in Minnesota
National Register of Historic Places in St. Louis County, Minnesota
Queen Anne architecture in Minnesota